Chorrera is a genus of snout moths. It was described by Harrison Gray Dyar Jr. in 1914.

Species
Chorrera extrincica (Dyar, 1919)
Chorrera idiotes Dyar, 1914
Chorrera postica (Zeller, 1881)

References

Phycitinae
Pyralidae genera